Andohariana is a rural municipality in Analamanga Region, in the  Central Highlands of Madagascar. It belongs to the district of Andramasina and its populations numbers to 5,104 in 2019.

References

Populated places in Analamanga